Aitkenvale is a suburb of Townsville in the City of Townsville, Queensland, Australia.

Geography
Aitkenvale is a major commercial and residential district of the city. The suburb is home to Townsville's biggest shopping centre and is home to branches of numerous companies. Aitkenvale is the biggest commercial centre in Townsville outside of the Townsville CBD, and is often referred to as the second CBD. Besides offices and shopping centres, the suburb is mainly residential and has some light industrial warehouses and workshops in the top north-eastern corner of the suburb. There is also a picturesque parkland along the bank of the Ross River.

History
Aitkenvale is situated in the traditional Wulgurukaba Aboriginal country.

The suburb is named after Thomas Aitken, the original grantee of Portion 38, Parish of Coonambelah. He began subdividing the property during the 1880s, putting 440 quarter-acre residential allotments on the market in 1885. A dairy farm was established in the region by Thomas Aitken in about 1867; the two remaining buildings of this farm (described as the Herdsman's Cottage and Cordial Factory) are still standing on what is now Leopold Street adjacent to Ross River.

Aitkenvale Methodist Church opened in 1885 on its current site. It was a small hall that was destroyed by Cyclone Sigma in 1896. Church services were then held in private homes until a new hall was built in 1914. During World War II, the Royal Australian Air Force occupied the building with services again being held in private homes. In 1959 the church building was moved to the western side of the block (where it still stands) in preparation for a new church to be built. The new brick church was officially opened in 1971. In 1975 the church initiated the Lifeline telephone counselling service in Townsville. With the creation of the Uniting Church in Australia in 1977, the Aitkenvale Methodist Church merged with St Stephen's Presbyterian Church to form the Aitkenvale Uniting Church.

The Townsville Golf Club is the oldest golf club in Queensland, having been established at Kissing Point in 1893. The club relocated to Aitkenvale in 1921, and then relocated to Rosslea in 1924.

Aitkenvale State School opened on 2 June 1924. During World War II, it was occupied by the Australian Armed Forces.

During the Second World War, Aitkenvale was home to the US Army's 13th Station Hospital, which comprised a 450-bed facility, located on the corner of Hatchett Street and Ross River Road.  Also, during the war, The area was the site of an aerodrome, located near Aitkenvale Weir on the banks of the Ross River.  It was built in 1942 for the Royal Australian Air Force as part of a group of wartime airfields.  The facility fell into disuse following the war, with the land eventually being redeveloped for housing.

Riverside Adventist Christian School opened on 14 January 1968.

The Aitkenvale public library opened in 1971.

Aitkenvale Special School opened on 28 August 1972. It closed on 31 December 2001, to be merged with Mundingburra Special School in Mundingburra to create the Townsville Community Learning Centre on the site of the former Mundingburra Special School.

Aboriginal and Torres Strait Islander people made up 6.7% of the population. 73.3% of people were born in Australia. 79.0% of people only spoke English at home. Other languages spoken at home included Somali at 2.2%. The most common responses for religion were No Religion 27.0%, Catholic 23.8% and Anglican 14.0%.

The suburb was affected by the 2019 Townsville flood with riverside areas around Thompson Street inundated, along with Ross River Road adjacent to the Aitkenvale Library where two bodies were found nearby in the aftermath.

Education 
Aitkenvale State School is a government primary (Prep-6) school for boys and girls at 67-85 Wotton Street. In 2018, the school had an enrolment of 492 students with 42 teachers (39 full-time equivalent) and 26 non-teaching staff (18 full-time equivalent). It includes an intensive English language program.

Riverside Adventist Christian School is a private primary (Prep-6) school for boys and girls at 59 Leopold Street. In 2018, the school had an enrolment of 50 students with 5 teachers (4 full-time equivalent) and 3 non-teaching staff (2 full-time equivalent).

There are no secondary schools in Aitkenvale. The nearest government secondary schools are Heatley Secondary College in neighbouring Heatley to the north-west and Pimlico State High School in neighbouring Gulliver to the north-east.

Amenities

Shopping 
Stockland Townsville is a shopping centre on the block bounded by Nathan Street, Ross River Road, Elizabeth Street and Alfred Street with the following major tenants:
Myer 
Big W 
Woolworths
Kmart (Cranbrook end)
Coles (Cranbrook end)

Parks 
There are a number of parks in the area:

 Aitkenvale Park
 Illich Park
 Leopold Street Park
 Riverview Park
 Rossiter Park
 Sabadine Street Park

Churches 
Aitkenvale Uniting Church is at 277-279 Ross River Road.

Public Libraries 
CityLibraries Aitkenvale at 4 Petunia Street, operated by CityLibraries Townsville

Sporting Grounds 
Illich Park (Centrals Rugby League)

References

External links

 

Suburbs of Townsville